Steve or Steven Peck may refer to:

Steve Peck (1929–2005), American film and TV actor (Lady in Cement#Cast)
Steven L. Peck (born 1957), American evolutionary biologist, blogger, poet and novelist
Steven W. Peck, American president of Green Roofs for Healthy Cities which he founded in 1999